This is a list of waterfalls of Tasmania, Australia.

External links
Waterfalls of Tasmania

 
Lists of tourist attractions in Tasmania
Tasmania
Lists of landforms of Tasmania